John Thomas Atkin (1883 – 15 December 1961) was an English professional footballer who made over 300 appearances as a full back in the Football League for Derby County.

Personal life 
Atkin served as a gunner in the Royal Garrison Artillery during the First World War.

Honours 
Derby County
 Football League Second Division (2): 1911–12, 1914–15

Career statistics

References

1883 births
1961 deaths
People from Newhall, Derbyshire
Footballers from Derbyshire
English footballers
Association football fullbacks
Newhall Swifts F.C. players
Derby County F.C. players
English Football League players
British Army personnel of World War I
Royal Garrison Artillery soldiers
Military personnel from Derbyshire